"All You Need to Know" is a song by American DJ and producer Gryffin and American DJ duo Slander featuring Swedish singer-songwriter Calle Lehmann. It was released on March 27, 2019, as the first single from his studio album Gravity.

Background
"All You Need to Know" is Gryffin's first collaboration with the DJ duo Slander and Swedish singer-songwriter Calle Lehmann. Lehmann previously featured on Galantis' track "Mama Look at Me Now" and co-wrote "Slow" for Liam Payne and "Don't Threaten Me with a Good Time" for Panic! at the Disco.

Composition
The website Bass Stud remarked on the song's "warm textures and hypnotic drop", and felt that the track "merges Gryffin's melodic genius and Slander's artful basslines and immaculate sound design, and Calle Lehmann infuses each line with his undeniably lovely vocals, resulting in a track that's soaring and euphoric".

Music video
The music video was released on September 6, 2019.

Charts

Weekly charts

Year-end charts

Certifications

References

2019 singles
2019 songs
Gryffin songs
Slander (DJs) songs
Songs written by Preston (singer)